This was the first edition of the tournament.

Timur Khabibulin and Aleksandr Nedovyesov won the title after defeating Ivan Gakhov and Nino Serdarušić 1–6, 6–3, [10–3] in the final.

Seeds

Draw

References
 Main Draw

Almaty Challenger - Doubles